HD 87822 is a triple star in the northern constellation of Leo Minor. The inner pair orbit each other with a period of about 18 years.

References

Spectroscopic binaries
Leo Minor
Triple stars
087822
3979
049658
Durchmusterung objects
F-type main-sequence stars
M-type main-sequence stars